Hamid is an Indian drama film directed by Aijaz Khan. The film stars Rasika Dugal, Vikas Kumar and Talha Arshad Reshi in major roles, and is an adaptation of the play Phone No. 786 by Mohd. Amin Bhat. The story revolves about a seven-year-old Hamid who learns that 786 is God's number and decides to try and reach out to God, by dialing this number. He wants to talk to his father, who his classmate tells him has gone to Allah. One fine day the phone call is answered, and two lives shattered in the strife of Kashmir find a way to be complete again. The film is produced by Yoodlee Films, a venture of Saregama. The official trailer was released on 10 October 2018. Global premiere of Hamid was held at the Jio MAMI 20th Mumbai Film Festival. The film went on to win the National Film Award for Best Feature Film in Urdu at the 66th National Film Awards hosted in December 2019.

Plot 

Hamid is a young boy of seven, in search of his father who went missing a year ago. He somehow discovers that 786 is Allah's number, makes some combination and finally dials a phone number which is answered. Thus begins a series of conversations with the person on the other line who happens to be a CRPF soldier finding solace in Hamid's innocent talk. Hamid tells him about his father, his teachings and how his absence has changed their lives. Meanwhile, Hamid's mother is not able to make peace with the fact that her husband has disappeared. She is always lost in her grief and is dejected. 
Hamid tries to learn his father's boat-making craft among various other means to please Allah, in belief that his father might return some day. Finally on one of the days Hamid realizes that his father is dead and would never return. His mother comes to terms with his death on the very same day. In the epilogue it is shown that Hamid finally gets his much desired red paint for the newly deigned boat (probably sent by the CRPF jawan), paints it and sails on it with his mother.

The film denotes how eventually people learn to deal with tragedies and move on no matter what, and serves as a powerful depiction of human resilience. What is striking is also the fact that despite being naive the boy knows the difference between what is right and what is wrong due to his father's teachings, again stressing the fact that we are a result of our upbringing.

Cast
Talha Arshad Reshi as Hamid
Vikas Kumar as Abhay 
Rasika Dugal as Ishrat
Sumit Kaul as Rehmat
Mir Sarwar as Abbass
Bashir Lone as Rasool Chacha
Veer Rajwant Singh as Rajinder
Ashraf Nagoo as Basheer
Qazi Faiz as Beggar
Umar Adil as Police Officer
Gulam Hussain Barji as Shopkeeper
Sajid as Police Constable
Shafia as Noor

Marketing and release
The theatrical release poster of the film was released on 11 February 2019 giving the release date as 1 March 2019. The release date was pushed back to 15 March 2019.

The trailer of the film was  released on 10 October 2018. It has 7.3 million views on YouTube since its release.

Home media
The film was made available for streaming on Netflix in May 2019.

Reception
The Hollywood Reporter finds the film sobering yet hopeful account of compassion emerging in the midst of conflict. Kunal Guha writing for Bangalore Mirror gives three stars out of five and feels that the film successfully managed to subliminally highlight the sentiments of Kashmiris without turning the film into a political statement. He calls it the biggest victory of the film.

Anupam Verma of Firstpost gave the film three stars out of five and stated "Hamid is a beautiful story whose translation to the screen is delivered with wildly different results throughout its run-time." Deccan Chronicle rated 3.5 out of 5 stars and found it to be "A well-told story of human perseverance and frailty."

Writing in The Hindu Namrata Joshi says "Hamid has a simplicity, humaneness and a sense of poise that is profoundly moving."

Accolades

Notes

References

External links 
 
 Hamid at Saregama
 

2010s Urdu-language films
Films set in Jammu and Kashmir
Kashmir conflict in films
Films about Islam
Indian films based on plays